Softonic.com is a web portal based in Barcelona, Catalonia, Spain. It was founded in June 1997 and is owned by Softonic International.

History 
Softonic started in 1996 as a file-oriented download service called Shareware Intercom, at Intercom Online (Grupo Intercom), a provider of Internet services in Cerdanyola del Vallès, near Barcelona (Catalonia, Spain). Files for the website originally came from the "Files Library Intercom BBS" at Intercom Online, using a "5-step semi-automated process", which was later greatly simplified. The company also offered monthly CDs of its software library for users tired of "having to wait for downloads to complete or pay exorbitant phone bills." In 1999, the service was described as having a "generosity of games, antivirus, education and the long, seductive etcetera." In 2000, the company became independent under the name Softonic. In 2004, Softonic was made available in German, and in 2005, English. Initially the service was oriented only to downloads of DOS and Windows software, but it evolved to offer software downloads for Mac and mobile platforms.

Softonic was listed as the "Best place to work in Spain (100–250 employees)" in an annual study by the Great Place to Work Institute from 2009–2011, and as second-best in 2008. In 2009 and 2011, the site was listed as having the most unique visitor traffic in Spain by audit bureau OJD Interactiva.

At the end of 2014, Softonic announced that a headcount reduction procedure would be carried out as a cost-cutting measure, allegedly due to financial and organizational reasons. In December, the company formalized the dismissal of 156 employees, against the initial estimation of 207.

In February 2015, Softonic announced that industry veteran and Download.com co-founder Scott Arpajian had been appointed as CEO of Softonic, replacing Founder Tomás Diago.

In July 2016, Softonic announced a partnership with business software platform Crozdesk.

In May 2017, the company announced that it had hired international executive Sophie Bernard as Vice President of Strategy.

In October 2019, Softonic acquired Ghacks.

Softonic acquired FileHippo;  the FileHippo home page states "Softonic International, S.A. holds the license to use the name and logo of Filehippo".

Softonic offers free download via Microsoft Windows Store of popular TRIO Office Suite software.

Controversies 
Softonic's "Softonic Downloader" was described by the company's CEO Scott Arpajian as having "facilitated bad behaviour amongst third party vendors which ended up harming the user", with malicious links impersonating the downloader itself. Arpajian said that the Downloader "grew revenue but was under the microscope as far as the industry was concerned, in particularly Google", who went on to withdraw its advertising from the site in 2014.

Arpajian said that shutting down the Softonic Downloader was one of the first things he had done when he took over the company in February 2015, and that his intention was to regain the trust of the site's users.

References 

Companies based in Barcelona
Download websites
File hosting
Internet properties established in 1997
Spanish brands
Malware